Sarah Morgan may refer to:

Sarah Morgan (writer) of Bigipedia etc.
Sarah Morgan (singer), British singer

See also